Moussonia  is a genus of land snails with an operculum, terrestrial gastropod molluscs in the family Diplommatinidae.

Species
Species within the genus Moussonia  include:

 Moussonia acuta Neubert & Bouchet, 2015
 Moussonia ahena Preston, 1913
 Moussonia barkeri Neubert & Bouchet, 2015
 Moussonia brodieae Neubert & Bouchet, 2015
 Moussonia echinata Greķe, 2017
 Moussonia fuscula (Mousson, 1870)
 Moussonia hirsuta (Zilch, 1953)
 Moussonia hyponepia (van Benthem Jutting, 1958)
 Moussonia longipalatalis Neubert & Bouchet, 2015
 Moussonia manuselae Greķe, 2017
 Moussonia minutissima Neubert & Bouchet, 2015
 Moussonia monstrificabilis Greķe, 2017
 Moussonia obesa Neubert & Bouchet, 2015
 Moussonia omias (van Benthem Jutting, 1958)
 Moussonia papuana Tapparone Canefri, 1883
 Moussonia polita Neubert & Bouchet, 2015
 Moussonia problematica (Mousson, 1865)
 Moussonia pseudoseparanda Greķe, 2017
 Moussonia separanda Greķe, 2017
 Moussonia strubelli (O. Boettger, 1891)
 Moussonia torricelli Greķe, 2017
 Moussonia uncinata Neubert & Bouchet, 2015
 Moussonia vitiana (Mousson, 1870)
 Moussonia vitianoides Neubert & Bouchet, 2015

Species brought into synonymy
 Moussonia apicina Gredler, 1885: synonym of Diplommatina apicina (Gredler, 1885) (original combination)
 Moussonia paxillus Gredler, 1881: synonym of Diplommatina paxillus paxillus (Gredler, 1881) (original combination)
 Moussonia typica O. Semper, 1865: synonym of Moussonia problematica (Mousson, 1865) (unnecessary substitute name)

References

External links
 
 Semper O. (1865). Addition au catalogue des Diplommatinacées. Journal de Conchyliologie. 13(3): 294-296

Diplommatinidae
Gastropod genera